Main Deewani is a 2014 Pakistani television drama series that originally aired on Hum TV from 1 February 2014 to 31 May 2014, airing a total 18 episodes. It was directed by Aabis Raza and was written by Faiza Iftikhar. The series revolves around the strange ethics of a girl, who suffers from a rare mental disorder called Erotomania. The series stars Saniya Shamshad, Fahad Mirza, Nirvaan Nadeem and Rabab Hashim in pivot roles. At the annual 3rd Hum Awards, the series received two nominations, including Best Actor in an Impactful Character for Shamshad and Best Original Soundtrack for Fariha Pervez.

Cast
 Saniya Shamshad as Hadia
 Fahad Mirza
 Rabab Hashim
 Nirvaan Nadeem
 Jamal Shah
 Samina Ahmed
 Lubna Aslam
 Mehmood Aslam

References

External links
 

Pakistani drama television series